Amityville most commonly refers to Amityville, New York.

Amityville may also refer to: 

 Amityville, Pennsylvania
 "Amityville", a song by Eminem from The Marshall Mathers LP
 "Amityville (The House on the Hill)", a 1986 song by Lovebug Starski

See also
 The Amityville Horror, a 1977 novel by Jay Anson that has spawned a series of films and other creative works